Mine Şenhuy Teber (born 29 July 1961) is a Turkish Cypriot actress.

Filmography

Television

Film

References

External links

1961 births
Living people
Turkish Cypriot actors
Turkish film actresses
20th-century Cypriot actresses
20th-century Turkish actresses
21st-century Cypriot actresses
Cypriot television actresses
People from North Nicosia